On November 8, 2016, the District of Columbia held a U.S. House of Representatives election for its shadow representative. Unlike its non-voting delegate, the shadow representative is only recognized by the district and is not officially sworn or seated. Incumbent Shadow Representative Franklin Garcia won reelection unopposed.

Primary elections
Primary elections were held on June 14, 2016 concurrent with the presidential primary.

Democratic primary

Candidates
 Franklin Garcia, incumbent Shadow Representative (since 2015)

Results

Other primaries
The Republican and D.C. Statehood Green parties held primaries, but no candidates declared and the contests saw only write-in votes.

General election
The general election took place on November 8, 2016. Garcia was the only candidate on the ballot and won reelection to a second term.

Results

References

Washington, D.C., Shadow Representative elections
2016 elections in Washington, D.C.